Homalium gracilipes is a species of plant in the family Salicaceae. It is endemic to Tanzania.

References

Flora of Tanzania
gracilipes
Vulnerable plants
Taxonomy articles created by Polbot